Abul Hossain is a politician for Rajshahi District of Bangladesh and former member of Parliament for Rajshahi-4 constituency in 1988.

Career 
Abul is the president of Rajshahi District Jatiya Party. He was elected to parliament from Rajshahi-4 as a Jatiya Party candidate in the 1988 Bangladeshi general election.

He was defeated from Rajshahi-4 constituency as a candidate of Jatiya Party in the fifth parliamentary elections of 1991. He was expecting the nomination of Jatiya Party in Rajshahi-5 constituency in the Eleventh Parliamentary Election of 2018.

References 

Living people
Year of birth missing (living people)
People from Rajshahi District
Jatiya Party (Ershad) politicians
4th Jatiya Sangsad members